Ocean Pointe is a housing development and a census-designated place (CDP) located in the Ewa District and the City & County of Honolulu on the leeward side of Oahu in Hawaii about  from Honolulu. As of the 2010 Census, the CDP had a total population of 8,361. This general area was previously known just as Ewa. In the late 19th century to early 20th century, Ewa was one of the large population centers on the Island of Oahu, with industry focused around sugar cane production. The Ewa Mill was a major employer that set up residential villages. Sugar cane is no longer grown on the Ewa Plain and Ocean Pointe is now part of Oahu's new suburban growth center—an area of substantial sprawl spreading unbroken to the south to Ewa Beach, north to Honouliuli, and west to Kalaeloa and Kapolei. This area is now referred to as Oahu's Second City, with a city center (downtown) located in Kapolei.

Geography 
Ocean Pointe is located at 21°18'38" North, 158°2'11" West (21.310556, -158.036389), inland from Ewa Beach on the west side of the main thoroughfare, Fort Weaver Road (Hawaii Route 76). This highway runs north past Ewa to Waipahu, connecting there to Farrington Highway (State Rte. 90) and the H-1 freeway. A major cross street is Kapolei Parkway, which connects to Kapolei City Center.

More specifically, the CDP is located west of Fort Weaver Road, south of Keaunui Drive, east and south of Essex Road, north of the Pacific Ocean, north of Pupu Place, west of Pupu Street, and north of Papipi Road (not including Papipi Drive, however).

Demographics 

As of the census of 2010, there were 8,361 people, 2,658 households, and 2,194 families residing in the CDP. The racial makeup of the CDP was 34.6% White, 7.4% African American, 0.6% Native American, 30.5% Asian, 4.1% Pacific Islander, 1.6% from other races, and 21.3% from two or more races. 10.7% of the population are Hispanic or Latino of any race.

There were 2,658 households, out of which 46.8% had children under the age of 18 living with them, 70.0% were married couples living together, 8.5% had a female householder with no husband present, and 17.5% were non-families. 11.7% of all households were made up of individuals, and 1.2% had someone living alone who was 65 years of age or older. The average household size was 3.14 and the average family size was 3.40.

In this CDP, the population was spread out, with 30.2% under the age of 18, 6.9% from 18 to 24, 38.5% from 25 to 44, 19.6% from 45 to 64, and 4.8% who were 65 years of age or older. The median age was 32.1 years. For every 100 females, there were 97.2 males. For every 100 females age 18 and over, there were 97.2 males.

Development 
The developer, Haseko Corporation, bought the community's  of land "in 1988 and sold its first homes a decade later." The last of the Ocean Pointe community's 2,500 homes were completed in 2008, with development then progressing to Hoakalei. A golf course, designed by Ernie Els, opened at the adjacent Hoakalei Resort in 2009. A marina was under construction since 1997, and its plans were scaled back in November 2011 to a recreational lagoon. The  lagoon and shoreside commercial development is to open for public use in February 2023.

1,800 homeowners filed a class-action lawsuit against Haseko in July 2013, claiming the developer's change in plans regarding the marina affected their property values. In September 2015, a jury ruled that Haseko must pay the plaintiffs millions of dollars in damages, including $1,300 per household (tripled to nearly $4,000 because of its being a consumer protection case); Haseko questioned authorization of the punitive damages award and said it planned to appeal the judgment. A month later, a circuit judge set aside the award, saying the applicable law didn't allow punitive damages, and citing a lack of evidence that homeowners had sustained damages. In January 2018, another circuit judge ruled that Haseko had to pay homeowners $20 million based on evidence that "the switch from the marina to the lagoon was an economic decision by Haseko to save money", and concurring that Haseko misled homebuyers. As before, Haseko plans to appeal the ruling.

A groundbreaking ceremony was held on November 3, 2011. City Mill, a chain of Oahu hardware stores, co-anchors the shopping center. Petco also joined the development's opening on November 16, 2012, with Walgreens and Ross opening in the second quarter of 2013. Safeway's development affiliate, Property Development Centers, sold the  shopping center in January 2014 for nearly $100 million to Terramar Retail Centers of San Diego.

Education 

The Hawaii Department of Education operates the public schools; those within the CDP include Ewa Makai Middle School (2011), Keoneula Elementary School (2007), and Ewa Beach Elementary School (1959). Most of Ocean Pointe's neighborhoods are zoned to attend the newer elementary school. A local private school is the Seagull School at Ocean Pointe.

References 

Census-designated places in Honolulu County, Hawaii
Populated places on Oahu
Populated coastal places in Hawaii